The 2015 NBL season was the 34th season of the National Basketball League. The season draw was supposed to be released in December 2014, but the withdrawal of Otago and Waikato prompted a rethink for the 2015 competition format. In the past, each team played each other twice in a 10-team competition, meaning each franchise had nine home games. However, with two fewer teams in 2015, it was decided the new format would be played over two and half rounds to keep incomes at a similar rate for the remaining sides. Each team was scheduled to play each other twice and play three of the sides in a third game.

The 2015 pre-season tournament was held at the Te Rauparaha Arena in Porirua on Saturday 21 March and Sunday 22 March. The Wellington Saints were the only team to go undefeated over the two days, finishing with a 3–0 record. The regular season commenced on Wednesday 1 April in Invercargill with the Southland Sharks hosting the Manawatu Jets at Stadium Southland.

In the regular-season finale on Sunday 28 June, Taranaki Mountainairs import Aaron Fuller set the National Basketball League record for points scored in a game. With 54 points, Fuller broke John Whorton's record of 50 points, which was set in 2003. Despite Fuller's 54 points and 19 rebounds, the Mountainairs lost to the Super City Rangers to finish the season with a winless record (0–18). The 2015 Mountainairs side joined the 1998 Northland Suns, 2009 Mountainairs and 2010 Otago Nuggets as the only sides in NBL history to go an entire season without a win.

The Final Four weekend was held in Wellington for the fourth time in five years, with the semifinals on Saturday 4 July, followed by the championship game on Sunday 5 July.

Team information

Summary

Regular season standings

Final Four

Awards

Player of the Week

Statistics leaders
Stats as of the end of the regular season

Regular season
 Most Valuable Player: Torrey Craig (Wellington Saints)
 NZ Most Valuable Player: Lindsay Tait (Wellington Saints)
 Most Outstanding Guard: Torrey Craig (Wellington Saints)
 Most Outstanding NZ Guard: Lindsay Tait (Wellington Saints)
 Most Outstanding Forward: Tai Wesley (Southland Sharks)
 Most Outstanding NZ Forward/Centre: Josh Duinker (Nelson Giants)
 Scoring Champion: Aaron Fuller (Taranaki Mountainairs)
 Rebounding Champion: Jeremiah Trueman (Manawatu Jets)
 Assist Champion: Lindsay Tait (Wellington Saints)
 Rookie of the Year: Josh Duinker (Nelson Giants)
 Coach of the Year: Paul Henare (Southland Sharks)
 All-Star Five:
 G: McKenzie Moore (Nelson Giants)
 G: Torrey Craig (Wellington Saints)
 F: Todd Blanchfield (Southland Sharks)
 F: Tai Wesley (Southland Sharks)
 C: Aaron Fuller (Taranaki Mountainairs)

Final Four
 Finals MVP: Tai Wesley (Southland Sharks)

References

External links
 2015 League Handbook
 The Year Of #ClassicNBL
 Season preview

National Basketball League (New Zealand) seasons
NBL